Oquawka Township is one of eleven townships in Henderson County, Illinois, USA.  As of the 2010 census, its population was 1,997 and it contained 1,117 housing units.

Geography

Cities, towns, villages
 Oquawka

Unincorporated towns
 Milroy at 
(This list is based on USGS data and may include former settlements.)

Cemeteries
The township contains these two cemeteries: County Farm and Oquawka.

Major highways
  Illinois Route 164

Lakes
 Island Lake
 White House Lake

Landmarks
 Benton Island
 Delabar State Park
 Mill Island

Demographics

School districts
 West Central Community Unit School District 235
 Westmer Community Unit School District 203

Political districts
 Illinois's 17th congressional district
 State House District 94
 State Senate District 47

References
 United States Census Bureau 2008 TIGER/Line Shapefiles
 
 United States National Atlas

External links
 City-Data.com
 Illinois State Archives
 Township Officials of Illinois

Townships in Henderson County, Illinois
1906 establishments in Illinois
Populated places established in 1906
Townships in Illinois
Illinois populated places on the Mississippi River